Jerusalem is a village in Monroe County, Ohio, United States. The population was 161 at the 2010 census.

Geography
Jerusalem is located at  (39.852261, -81.095146).

Demographics

2010 census
As of the census of 2010, there were 161 people, 70 households, and 46 families living in the village. The racial makeup of the village was 100.0% White. Hispanic or Latino of any race were 1.2% of the population.

There were 70 households, of which 25.7% had children under the age of 18 living with them, 40.0% were married couples living together, 22.9% had a female householder with no husband present, 2.9% had a male householder with no wife present, and 34.3% were non-families. 28.6% of all households were made up of individuals, and 10% had someone living alone who was 65 years of age or older. The average household size was 2.30 and the average family size was 2.63.

The median age in the village was 43.8 years. 21.7% of residents were under the age of 18; 9.5% were between the ages of 18 and 24; 22.9% were from 25 to 44; 23% were from 45 to 64; and 23% were 65 years of age or older. The gender makeup of the village was 51.6% male and 48.4% female.

2000 census
As of the census of 2000, there were 152 people, 69 households, and 48 families living in the village. The population density was 605.6 people per square mile (234.8/km2). There were 74 housing units at an average density of 294.8 per square mile (114.3/km2). The racial makeup of the village was 100.00% White.

There were 69 households, out of which 23.2% had children under the age of 18 living with them, 55.1% were married couples living together, 13.0% had a female householder with no husband present, and 30.4% were non-families. 27.5% of all households were made up of individuals, and 17.4% had someone living alone who was 65 years of age or older. The average household size was 2.20 and the average family size was 2.67.

In the village, the population was spread out, with 17.8% under the age of 18, 5.3% from 18 to 24, 28.9% from 25 to 44, 27.0% from 45 to 64, and 21.1% who were 65 years of age or older. The median age was 44 years. For every 100 females there were 87.7 males. For every 100 females age 18 and over, there were 81.2 males.

The median income for a household in the village was $28,000, and the median income for a family was $33,611. Males had a median income of $22,917 versus $16,250 for females. The per capita income for the village was $12,873. About 9.6% of families and 13.5% of the population were below the poverty line, including 25.6% of those under the age of eighteen and 5.1% of those 65 or over.

Education
Jerusalem is served by the Monroe County District Library from its administrative offices in Woodsfield, Ohio.

References

Villages in Monroe County, Ohio
Villages in Ohio